Richard Kalod (born 8 May 1984) is a professional Czech football player who currently plays for SK Dynamo České Budějovice. He previously played regularly for Viktoria Žižkov for several years, where his role usually involved him playing a ball winning job up front, often alone. He is an uncompromising player who has scored several match winning goals. As a result, he was popular with Žižkov's fans.

References

External links
 Guardian Football
 

1984 births
Living people
Czech footballers
Czech First League players
FK Viktoria Žižkov players
FC Fastav Zlín players
Association football forwards